Amphisbaena arenaria is a species of worm lizard found in Brazil.

References

Further reading
Vanzolini, P.E. 1991. Two further new species of Amphisbaena from semi-arid northeast Brasil (Reptilia, Amphisbaenia). Papéis Avulsos de Zoologia, Museu de Zoologia da Universidade de São Paulo 37 (23): 347–361.

arenaria
Reptiles described in 1991
Endemic fauna of Brazil
Reptiles of Brazil
Taxa named by Paulo Vanzolini